Yuri Aleksandrovich Petukhov (born 19 February 1960 in Minsk) is a Belarusian professional football coach and a former player currently working as goalkeepers coach with FC Solyaris Moscow.

External links
 

1960 births
Living people
Soviet footballers
Belarusian footballers
Soviet expatriate footballers
Belarusian expatriate footballers
Expatriate footballers in Czechoslovakia
FC Spartak Semey players
FC Metalist Kharkiv players
FC Dnepr Mogilev players
FC Lokomotíva Košice players
Association football goalkeepers